Brassia arachnoidea is a species of orchid. It is endemic to the Rio de Janeiro region of Brazil.

References

arachnoidea
Orchids of Brazil
Plants described in 1877